The Paraguayan ambassador in Rome is the official representative of the Government in Asunción to the Government of Italy. 

The Paraguayan ambassador next to the government in Rome, with residence in Rome is concurrently accredited to the governments in San Marino, Jerusalem, Ljubljana (Slovenia), Athens and Bucharest.

List of representatives

References

External Links 
 List compiled by Ricardo Scavone Yegros of Paraguayan diplomatic mission personnel, from 1842 to 2011
 Historic list from the Paraguayan Ministry of Foreign Affairs of Paraguayan diplomatic mission personnel

 
Italy
Paraguay